The Bistricioara is a right tributary of the river Bistrița in Romania. It flows into the Bistrița in Peștișani.

References

Rivers of Romania
Rivers of Gorj County